The  is a major river that flows through northern Mie Prefecture on the island of Honshū, Japan.  It is officially classified as a Class 1 river by the Japanese government, one of four Class 1 rivers that flow solely through Mie.

The river's source is on Mount Nasugahara, which stands on the border of Mie and Shiga Prefectures.  From the mountain, it then flows eastwards, eventually flowing into Ise Bay.

A section of the Tōkaidō, a major travel route in the Edo era, ran along the north side of the river for most of its course.  The modern versions of this portion of the old Tokaido, the Kansai Main Line and Route 1, likewise run parallel with the river.

Course
Mie Prefecture
Kameyama • Suzuka • Yokkaichi

References

  Wikipedia - Suzuka River

Rivers of Mie Prefecture
Rivers of Japan